Mary Burns (1821–1863) was an Irish partner of Friedrich Engels.

Mary Burns may also refer to:

 Mary Burns (soldier), soldier in the United States Civil War
 Mary Burns Laird, Scottish feminist activist
 Marilyn Burns (Mary Lynn Ann Burns, 1950–2014), American actress
 Mary Harcourt, Viscountess Harcourt (1874–1961), born Mary Ethel Burns

See also
 Sister Mary Grace Burns Arboretum, Lakewood Township, New Jersey, USA
 Mary Burns, Fugitive, a 1935 film
 Mary Byrne (disambiguation)